Daşbulaq (also, Dashbulag and Dashbulak) is a village and municipality in the Shaki Rayon of Azerbaijan.  It has a population of 434.

References 

Populated places in Shaki District